Ajol is a village in Mansa Taluka of Gandhinagar district, Gujarat, India. It is well known for its silk weaving.

Demographics
As of the 2001 India census, Ajol had a population of 5,844. Males constitute 52% of the population and females 48%. Ajol has an average literacy rate of 82%, higher than the national average of 59.5%: male literacy is 90%, and female literacy is 73%. In Ajol, 11% of the population is under 6 years of age.

Places of interest
The Boria Mahadev temple is popular among followers. Swami Sadashiv Saraswati lived here for a long time. It is believed that he participated in Indian rebellion of 1857. He died here on Kartik Sud 10, Samvat 1999 (1938 AD).

References 

Villages in Gandhinagar district